Sheptock is a surname. Notable people with the surname include:

Eric Sheptock (born 1969), American homelessness activist
Frank Sheptock (born 1963), American football player